This is a list of mayors of Shanghai, China. In the People's Republic of China, the mayor is subordinate to the Communist Party Secretary of Shanghai.

Republic of China

Mayor of the Shanghai Special Municipal Government 

 Huang Fu (July 7, 1927 – August 14, 1927)
 Wu Zhenxiu (August 15, 1927 – September 16, 1927)
 Zhang Dingfan (September 17, 1927 – March 31, 1929)
 Zhang Qun (April 1, 1929 – June 29, 1930)

Mayor of the Shanghai Municipal Government 

 Zhang Qun (July 1, 1930 – January 6, 1932)
 Wu Tieh-cheng (January 7, 1932 –  March 31, 1937)
 Yu Hung-chun (April 1, 1937 – August 13, 1945)

Mayors under Japanese occupation

Mayor of the Great Way Municipal Government of Shanghai 

 Su Xiwen (December 5, 1937 –  April 27, 1938)

Supervisor of the Shanghai Municipal Great Way Office 

 Su Xiwen (April 28, 1938 –  October 15, 1938)

Mayor of the Shanghai Special Municipal Government 

 Fu Xiaoan (October 16, 1938 – October 11, 1940)
 Su Xiwen (October 11, 1940 – November 19, 1940)
 Chen Gongbo (November 20, 1940 – November 11, 1944)
 Wu Songgao (November 12, 1944 – January 14, 1945)
 Zhou Fohai (January 15, 1944 – September 12, 1945)

Mayor of the Shanghai Municipal Government (after World War II) 

 Qian Dajun (September 12, 1945 – May 19, 1946)
 K. C. Wu (May 20, 1946 – April 30, 1949)
 Chen Liang (April 1-30, 1949)
 Zhao Zukang (May 24, 1949 – May 28, 1949)

People's Republic of China

Mayor of the Shanghai Municipal People's Government 

 Chen Yi (May 28, 1949 – February 1955)

Mayor of the Shanghai Municipal People's Committee 

 Chen Yi (February 1955 – November 1958)
 Ke Qingshi (November 1958 – April 1965)
 Cao Diqiu (November 1965 – February 1967)

Director of the Shanghai People's Commune Interim Committee 

 Zhang Chunqiao (February 1967)

Director of the Shanghai Municipal Revolutionary Committee 

 Zhang Chunqiao (February 1967 – October 1976)
 Su Zhenhua (October 1976 – January 1979)
 Peng Chong (January 1979 – December 1979)

Mayor of the Shanghai Municipal People's Government (from 1979)

References 

 
Lists of mayors of places in China
Shanghai-related lists